Brian T. Fitch is a british non-fiction author, and professor of French in Toronto at Trinity College. He was nominated for a 2000 Governor General's Award for À l'ombre de la littérature and a 2004 Governor General's Award for Le langage de la pensée et l'écriture : Humboldt, Valéry, Beckett. He is a member of the Royal Society of Canada since 1976.

References

Canadian literary critics
Canadian non-fiction writers in French
Living people
Year of birth missing (living people)
Canadian male non-fiction writers